Dan Webb (born 13 August 1989), is an Australian musician, entrepreneur, music journalist and critic.

Career
Early in his music career, Webb garnered much attention for his energetic and partly improvised live shows. One of Webb's most notable stage antics at the time involved him playing his keyboard behind his back, in a style similar to Jimi Hendrix. He has collaborated with a number of artists over the years, including Kylie Auldist, Bobby Flynn, actress Ashleigh Cummings and the horn sections of The Cat Empire and The Black Seeds.

In 2011 he played five shows in a UK tour, played two sets at St Kilda Festival and supported Conway Savage. He headlined a tour of New Zealand in 2012 and performed at Newtown Festival in Wellington. Webb released demos of twelve original songs for free download, one a month, from his official website in 2013. These songs were later developed and released on his 2014 studio album Sandstorm. The first demo to be released, "Departure" featured Auldist on co-vocals and debuted on The Craig Charles Funk and Soul Show on BBC Radio 6 Music on 26 January 2013. Webb played seven shows in January and February 2013 on his most extensive Australian tour to date, before announcing an extended leave from live music performance.

His 2017 album Oedipus The King was recorded in the lead up to the 2016 US election and released on the same day as Donald Trump's Inauguration.

Discography

Albums
 Sandstorm – Misdemeanor Records/MGM Distribution (May 2014)
 Oedipus The King – Sungenre (January 2017)
 Exotic Erotic Concoction – Independent (July 2019)

EPs
 Capitulation – Independent (March 2009)
 Hyperspace Clearance – Independent/MGM Distribution (September 2010)
 Sailing – Misdemeanor Records (October 2015)

Singles
 Sleep (feat. Ashleigh Cummings) – Misdemeanor Records/MGM Distribution (February 2014)
 Coming Up Roses – Misdemeanor Records/MGM Distribution (June 2014)

References

External links
Dan Webb on Bandcamp
Dan's writer archive on sungenre.com

1989 births
Living people
Australian singer-songwriters
21st-century Australian singers
21st-century Australian male singers
Australian male singer-songwriters